A list of Luftwaffe "Luftflotten" (Air Fleets) and their locations between 1939 and 1945.

Timeline

1939
 Before the invasion of Poland.
 Luftflotte 1 (Northeast Germany)
 Luftflotte 2 (Northwest Germany)
 Luftflotte 3 (Southwest Germany)
 Luftflotte 4 (Southeast Germany and Austria)

1940
 Luftwaffe Order of Battle August 1940.
 Luftflotte 1 (Poland)
 Luftflotte 2 (The Netherlands, Belgium, Northern Germany)
 Luftflotte 3 (France, Luxembourg, Middle Germany)
 Luftflotte 4 (Austria and Czech Republic)
 Luftflotte 5 (Norway and Denmark)

1942
 During operations on the Eastern and African fronts.
Luftflotte 1 (Russian Northern front)
Luftflotte 2 (North Africa, Southern Italy and Greece)
Luftflotte 3 (France, the Netherlands and Belgium)
Luftflotte 4 (Black Sea coast, Ukraine, the Caucasus)
Luftflotte 5 (Norway and Finland)
Luftflotte 6 (Central Russian front, Belarus)

1944
 During the last stages of the Eastern front, the Balkans, North Italy and West area.
 Luftflotte 1 (Baltic coasts)
Luftflotte 2 (Northern Italy)
 Luftflotte 3 (France, Belgium and the Netherlands)
 Luftflotte 4 (Hungary, Yugoslavia, Bulgaria and Romania)
 Luftflotte 5 (Norway and Finland)
 Luftflotte 6 (Russian Central front, Belarus)
Luftflotte Reich Deutschland (Germany)
 Luftflotte 10 (Ergänzungs- und Ausbildungseinheiten; replacement and training units) (Berlin)

1945
 During the last period of conflict on the European front.
Luftflotte 1 (Lithuania)
Luftflotte 2 (Northern Italy)
Luftflotte 3 (West Germany and the Netherlands)
Luftflotte 4 (Hungary and Yugoslavia)
Luftflotte 5 (Norway and Finland)
Luftflotte 6 (East Germany)
Luftflotte Reich (Central Germany)
Luftflotte 10 (Berlin)

See also
Luftwaffe Organization

Sources